Starcrawler is the debut studio album by American rock band Starcrawler. The album was released on January 19, 2018 by Rough Trade Records and produced by rock/alternative country band Whiskeytown's former member, Ryan Adams.

Critical reception

Starcrawler was met with "generally favorable" reviews from critics. At Metacritic, which assigns a weighted average rating out of 100 to reviews from mainstream publications, this release received an average score of 71, based on 7 reviews. Aggregator Album of the Year gave the release a 70 out of 100 based on a critical consensus of 4 reviews.

Track listing

Personnel
Adapted from album booklet and AllMusic.

Starcrawler
Arrow de Wilde – lead vocals, composition
Henri Cash – guitar, synthesizer, vocals, composition
Timothy Franco – bass, composition
Austin Smith – drums, composition

Additional personnel
Ryan Adams – production
Autumn de Wilde – photographer
Gavin Lurssen – mastering
Charlie Stavish – engineering, mixing
Mike Zimmerman – design

Charts

References

2018 debut albums
Starcrawler albums
Rough Trade Records albums